This is a list of transfers for the 2023 Canadian Premier League season.

This list includes all transfers involving Canadian Premier League clubs after their last match of the 2022 Canadian Premier League season and before their last match of the 2023 season.

Transfers  

Clubs without flags are Canadian.

References

2023
Transfers
Canadian Premier League